La Venta (or La Venta del Sur) is a municipality in the south of the Honduran department of Francisco Morazán.

It is approximately 52 km from the national capital, Tegucigalpa, and lies just off the Pan-American Highway.

The town has valuable forestry assets, and the main form of employment locally is agriculture, particularly of plums and other soft fruits.
   

Municipalities of the Francisco Morazán Department